Morocco are one of Africa's major forces in the Africa Cup of Nations.

Historically, Morocco participated in the AFCON much later than other North African states. However, once Morocco made their debut in 1972, Morocco emerged and became a fearsome power of the tournament, becoming the second North African side to win the AFCON at 1976. However, ever since the win, Morocco's best performance was only runners-up in 2004. Morocco therefore, became the underachiever in the AFCON, in spite of their rich, prestigious records.

Morocco was initially scheduled to host the 2015 Africa Cup of Nations, but was later ruled out after the fear of Ebola outbreak controversy.

Overall record

By match

Squads

References

External links
Africa Cup of Nations – Archives competitions – cafonline.com

Morocco national football team
Countries at the Africa Cup of Nations